Unično is a small settlement in the hills north of Brdce in the Municipality of Hrastnik in central Slovenia. The area is part of the traditional region of Styria. It is now included with the rest of the municipality in the Central Sava Statistical Region.

References

External links
Unično on Geopedia

Populated places in the Municipality of Hrastnik